Respublika is a political party in Kyrgyzstan. The party was formed in June 2010. Founded by Ömürbek Babanov, he served as its chairman until 2014, and during this time the party had a pro-Russia orientation. In 2014, the party merged with Ata-Zhurt to create Respublika–Ata Zhurt. However, the two parties ended up splitting back in 2020.

The party campaigned for the 2010 parliamentary elections on a platform stressing the ethnic diversity of Kyrgyzstan, and is in favor of a parliamentary system of government, as well as reducing the number of MPs from 120 to 75.

References

Political parties in Kyrgyzstan
Political parties established in 2010
2010 establishments in Kyrgyzstan
Classical liberal parties